Jide Macaulay (born 4 November 1966) is an openly gay British-Nigerian LGBTQ rights activist and ordained priest by the Anglican Church of England. He is the founding Pastor of House Of Rainbow Nigeria's first house of worship catering for the LGBTQ community in Nigeria, and was honoured as 2007 Man of the Year by the UK Black LGBT for his role in helping LGBT people of faith.

References 

1966 births
Living people
Nigerian gay men
Nigerian LGBT rights activists
LGBT Anglican clergy